The Central District of Abyek County is a district (bakhsh) in Abyek County, Qazvin Province, Iran. At the 2006 census, its population was 68,350, in 17,911 families.  The District has one city: Abyek.  The District has three rural districts (dehestan): Kuhpayeh-e Gharbi Rural District, Kuhpayeh-e Sharqi Rural District, and Ziaran Rural District.

References 

Districts of Qazvin Province
Abyek County